Tariq Alam (born 30 May 1956) is a former Pakistani first-class cricketer. He played for the House Building Finance Corporation cricket team from 1978/79 until 1993/94. His son Fawad Alam, is a Test and ODI cricketer for Pakistan.

External links
"The Jugaaroo"

1956 births
Living people
Pakistani cricketers
Cricketers from Karachi
House Building Finance Corporation cricketers
Karachi B cricketers
Karachi Blues cricketers
Karachi Whites cricketers
Sind B cricketers
Sind A cricketers
Sindh cricketers